Samira Raif (born 4 April 1974 in Casablanca) is a Moroccan long-distance runner. She competed in the marathon at the 2012 Summer Olympics, placing 73rd with a time of 2:38:31, a seasonal best.

References

1974 births
Living people
Moroccan female long-distance runners
Olympic athletes of Morocco
Athletes (track and field) at the 2012 Summer Olympics
Sportspeople from Casablanca
Mediterranean Games silver medalists for Morocco
Mediterranean Games medalists in athletics
Athletes (track and field) at the 1997 Mediterranean Games
Athletes (track and field) at the 2009 Mediterranean Games
20th-century Moroccan women
21st-century Moroccan women